The Arce Cabinet constitutes the 222nd cabinet of the Plurinational State of Bolivia. It was formed on 9 November 2020, one day after Luis Arce was sworn in as the 67th president of Bolivia following the 2020 general election, succeeding the Áñez Cabinet. The cabinet is composed entirely of members of the ruling Movement for Socialism. Described as a "technocratic" cabinet, it has been noted for the low-profile and youth of some of its members as well as its political distance from former president Evo Morales.

Council of Ministers

Composition

History 
According to Arce, the council of ministers accompanying him would be "an austere government with the priority of reactivating the economy and examining the health crisis". The cabinet has been noted for the low profile of its appointed members, predominantly made up of low-level officials and academics who, despite their youth, have long management experience. Political scientist Helena Argirakis affirms that "certain fundamental features that characterize the MAS" are maintained in this cabinet, while at the same time it balances "experience and innovation, the country's regional diversity and professional, political, union and social training". Analysts also highlighted the distance between the appointees and former president and MAS leader Evo Morales. Among the ministers, only Minister of Defense Edmundo Novillo had any long history within the ranks of MAS, being president of the Chamber of Deputies and governor of Cochabamba. These factors reaffirmed Arce's statement that Morales would have no direct participation in his administration.

A year into the Arce administration, calls for renewal within the cabinet among sectors related to the MAS began to arise. On 30 December 2021, Morales publicly requested that Arce "improve his cabinet". The following day, Deputy Daniel Rojas went one step further, calling some members of Arce's cabinet "parasites" and affirming that certain social organizations were discontent with their management. Meanwhile, Deputy Juanito Angulo announced that the Plurinational Legislative Assembly would evaluate the cabinet upon returning from parliamentary recess and intended to make recommendations for change based on that. Deputy Héctor Arce stated that the assembly would wait for a response by 22 or 23 January —the traditional date in which Morales ratified his ministers in each year of his administration— "and if the suggested changes are not carried out, we will take action on the matter".

Among the complaints of the MAS was the view that some ministers were not sufficiently political. Eight ministers were observed as not holding political militancy within the MAS: Minister of Foreign Affairs Rogelio Mayta; of Government Eduardo del Castillo; of Justice, Iván Lima; of Economy, Marcelo Montenegro; of Hydrocarbons, Franklin Molina; of Mining, Ramiro Villavicencio; of Planning, Gabriela Mendoza; and of Labor, Verónica Navia Tejada. In particular, del Castillo and Lima were spotlighted for the lack of enforceable convictions against those responsible for the alleged coup d'état that ousted Morales during the 2019 political crisis. On 6 January 2022, the Unified Syndical Confederation of Rural Workers (CSUTCB) passed a motion to censure del Castillo and Lima along with five other ministers and three vice ministers for "not working at the height of their mandate and being negligent". On the matter, Página Siete pointed out that "Morales puts Arce in a jam because, after his demand, the president will have to make a decision: if he makes cabinet changes, he will show himself as a president without authority and as a puppet of Evo Morales, and if he does not do so, he will have to enter a public confrontation with his own political boss". 

At a five-hour meeting held on 19 January 2022, the Arce administration and the Pact of Unity agreed to postpone any cabinet changes until 11 February. On that date, the unions conceded to the president, allowing him to ratify his cabinet without changing ministers. In exchange, Arce agreed to allow them to carry out a "permanent evaluation" of his cabinet on a monthly basis.

Cabinets

Structural changes 
Arce's cabinet initially received criticism from indigenous leaders such as Felipe Quispe due to its lack of indigenous representation. However, on 13 November 2020, Arce issued Supreme Decree N° 4393 which reinstated the Ministry of Cultures, which had previously been reduced to a viceministry under the Ministry of Education by the administration of Jeanine Áñez. The new office was dubbed as the Ministry of Cultures, Decolonization, and Depatriarchalization and was given the expanded task of combating "inequality between nationalities, as well as between men and women". As well as elevating the portfolio of cultures into its own ministry, the portfolio of sports was also stripped from the Ministry of Education and reassigned to the Ministry of Health. The Vice Ministry of Communications also noted that the creation of the new state agency came thanks to the unification of the energies and hydrocarbons portfolios into a single office, thus keeping the same number of cabinet posts.

The new changes came into effect on 19 November when Édgar Pozo, Adrián Quelca, and Franklin Molina Ortiz were ratified in their positions under new titles by Presidential Decree  N° 4397. Sabina Orellana, of Quechua origin, was appointed to head the new ministry the following day, adding one indigenous representative to the cabinet.

References

Notes

Footnotes 

2020 establishments in Bolivia
Cabinets of Bolivia
Cabinets established in 2020
Current governments